Chad LaRose (born March 27, 1982) is an American former professional hockey player. He has previously played as a Stanley Cup winner for the Carolina Hurricanes of the National Hockey League (NHL).

Playing career
As a youth, LaRose played in the 1996 Quebec International Pee-Wee Hockey Tournament with the Detroit Compuware minor ice hockey team.

A product of the USHL's Sioux Falls Stampede, LaRose later led the OHL Plymouth Whalers in scoring in 2002–03 with 117 points in 67 games. LaRose was never drafted, but his breakout overage season caught the attention of NHL scouts. He was an invitee to the Detroit Red Wings training camp in 2001 and 2002.

LaRose started the 2003–04 season with the Florida Everblades of the ECHL, and was shuttling back and forth between there and the Lowell Lock Monsters for most of the second half of the year.

LaRose was signed by the Carolina Hurricanes as a free agent in 2003.  LaRose is the only hockey player to play for all the Karmanos’ teams, as he started out with the Plymouth Whalers, before moving on to the Florida Everblades, working his way to the Carolina Hurricanes. After winning his first Stanley Cup, LaRose signed a two-year contract to stay a Carolina Hurricanes.

On July 2, 2009, the Hurricanes re-signed LaRose to a further two-year contract worth $3.4 million ($1.5 million in 2009-10 and $1.9 million in 2010-11).

LaRose rejoined the Carolina Hurricanes organization by signing a one-year deal with the team's AHL affiliate, the Charlotte Checkers, on July 29, 2014. In the 2014–15 season, LaRose added a veteran presence to the Checkers while regaining his scoring touch with 20 goals and 38 points in 64 games.

Unable to attain a NHL contract over the summer, LaRose sat out the following season before opting to continue his playing career in the ECHL during the 2016–17 campaign, with the Orlando Solar Bears on January 25, 2017.  LaRose was released on February 25, 2017.

Records
Plymouth Whalers record for most goals in regular season (61 in 2002–03)

Career statistics

Regular season and playoffs

International

Awards and honors

References

External links
 

1982 births
Living people
American men's ice hockey right wingers
Carolina Hurricanes players
Charlotte Checkers (2010–) players
Florida Everblades players
Ice hockey players from Michigan
Lowell Lock Monsters players
Orlando Solar Bears (ECHL) players
People from Fraser, Michigan
Plymouth Whalers players
Sioux Falls Stampede players
Sportspeople from Metro Detroit
Stanley Cup champions
Undrafted National Hockey League players